The Abilene Christian Wildcats men's basketball team represents Abilene Christian University (ACU) in Abilene, Texas, United States. The Wildcats joined the Western Athletic Conference (WAC) on July 1, 2021, after having spent the previous eight years in the Southland Conference. Before this move, ACU's most recent conference change was in the 2013 offseason, when the Wildcats made the jump to NCAA Division I and rejoined the Southland Conference after a 40-year absence. They are led by head coach Brette Tanner and play their home games at Moody Coliseum.

In 2019, the Wildcats won the Southland Conference and earned their first Division I NCAA Tournament appearance. The Wildcats recorded their first tournament win in 2021, upsetting #3 seeded Texas 53–52.

Postseason

NCAA Division I Tournament results
Abilene Christian has appeared in the NCAA Division I tournament twice. Their record is 1–2.

NCAA Division II Tournament results
The Wildcats have appeared in the NCAA Division II tournament nine times. Their combined record is 9–11.

CBI results
The Wildcats have appeared in the College Basketball Invitational (CBI) one time. Their record is 2–1.

CIT results
The Wildcats have appeared in the CollegeInsider.com Postseason Tournament (CIT) one time. Their record is 0–1.

References

External links
Website